Paenisporosarcina indica is a psychrophilic, Gram-positive, aerobic, spore-forming and rod-shaped  bacterium from the genus of Paenisporosarcina which has been isolated from  soil near the Pindari glacier in the Himalayas.

References 

Bacillales
Bacteria described in 2013